The 2018 Stanley Cup Finals was the championship series of the National Hockey League's (NHL) 2017–18 season and the culmination of the 2018 Stanley Cup playoffs. The Eastern Conference champion Washington Capitals defeated the Western Conference champion Vegas Golden Knights four games to one to win their first championship, in their 44th season. The Vegas Golden Knights made the Finals in their first season, while this was the second Finals appearance for the Capitals. This was the first Finals series since 2007 where neither team had previously won the Stanley Cup and the third consecutive year in which a Western Conference team made their Finals debut. This was the first Finals since 2014 to require fewer than six games. Washington captain Alexander Ovechkin was awarded the Conn Smythe Trophy as the most valuable player of the playoffs.

The series began on May 28 and ended on June 7. The Vegas Golden Knights had home ice advantage in the series since the Golden Knights won the Pacific Division with 109 points during the regular season, while the Capitals won the Metropolitan Division with 105 points.

Path to the Finals

Washington Capitals

This was Washington's second Finals appearance; the Capitals were swept in four games by the Detroit Red Wings in 1998.

The Capitals did not make many major offseason transactions with the exception of signing forward Devante Smith-Pelly. Major re-signings during the off-season included forwards T. J. Oshie, Evgeny Kuznetsov, and Andre Burakovsky; and goalie Philipp Grubauer. Washington then re-signed Lars Eller during the season. The team was conservative during the trade deadline. Wanting to make a Stanley Cup run with the core players that they already had, they only acquired defensemen Michal Kempny from the Chicago Blackhawks and Jakub Jerabek from the Montreal Canadiens.

The Capitals finished the regular season with 105 points (49–26–7), winning their division. Left winger and team captain Alexander Ovechkin was the winner of this season's Maurice "Rocket" Richard Trophy, leading the league with 49 regular-season goals. Kuznetsov led the team in assists with 56.

In the first round of playoffs, Washington came back from a 0–2 series deficit to win four in a row to beat the Columbus Blue Jackets in six games. The Capitals then won a 4–2 series against their division rival and two-time defending champion Pittsburgh Penguins, whom the Capitals had beaten in a playoff series only once in ten previous attempts since 1994; losing the last seven prior series to them. The Penguins had eliminated Washington from the playoffs in the second round the previous two years. Washington then defeated the Tampa Bay Lightning in the Eastern Conference Finals in seven games, winning game seven on the road for only the second time in franchise history and first since 2012.

Vegas Golden Knights

Vegas became the first expansion team since the 1967–68 St. Louis Blues to make the Stanley Cup Finals in their inaugural season. However, the 1967–68 expansion was structured so that an expansion team was guaranteed to make the final. By contrast, the Golden Knights entered the season as long shots to make the postseason, let alone the Finals, with sources like Deadspin and Newsweek predicting that the Golden Knights would be among the worst teams in the league. However, the Golden Knights exceeded even the most optimistic projections to turn in one of the strongest debut seasons for an expansion team in North American professional sports history.

Las Vegas was awarded as the NHL's 31st franchise on June 22, 2016, to begin to play for the 2017–18 season. On April 13, 2017, the team announced the hiring of their inaugural head coach, Gerard Gallant. The team then participated in the 2017 NHL Expansion Draft on June 21, selecting an available player from all of the other 30 NHL teams. Some notable selections included goalie Marc-Andre Fleury, who had won three Stanley Cups as a member of the Pittsburgh Penguins, winger James Neal from the Nashville Predators, and Jonathan Marchessault from the Florida Panthers. Fleury was left exposed by the Penguins because of the emergence of Matt Murray. The Panthers, who had salary cap issues, traded Reilly Smith to the Golden Knights in exchange for Vegas selecting Marchessault.

The team started winning, despite Fleury being injured for most of the first months of the season. The team relied on four other goaltenders while their starter was injured. Instead of being sellers trying to unload players with one-year contracts by the trade deadline, Vegas became surprise buyers, acquiring Ryan Reaves from the Penguins and Tomas Tatar from the Detroit Red Wings.

On March 26, 2018, Vegas became the first team to make the playoffs in their inaugural season in the league since the Edmonton Oilers and Hartford Whalers in the 1979–80 season. Following that achievement, on March 31, Vegas became the first modern-era expansion team from any of the four major sports and the first NHL team since the 1926–27 New York Rangers to win their division in their inaugural season (excluding the 1967–68 Philadelphia Flyers, as all teams in the West Division that year were expansion teams). The Golden Knights ended up finishing the regular season with 109 points (51–24–7). In the playoffs, Vegas swept the Los Angeles Kings in four games, defeated the San Jose Sharks in six games, and eliminated the Winnipeg Jets in the Western Conference Finals in five games.

With Vegas' trip to the 2018 Finals, a brand-new team in the league has now reached the Stanley Cup Finals every 50 years dating back to 1918. The Toronto Arenas reached the 1918 Stanley Cup Finals and won the Cup, but this was the first year of the new NHL (after every team except the Toronto Blueshirts left the National Hockey Association). The St. Louis Blues reached the 1968 Stanley Cup Finals and got swept by the Montreal Canadiens. However, the Blues and five other brand-new expansion teams all entered the league at the same time and were all placed in the West Division, with the Original Six comprising the East Division. The playoffs were structured so that one of the newly minted teams was guaranteed a berth in the Finals. In contrast, the Golden Knights were the first true expansion team in NHL history to advance all the way to the Finals while not playing in an all-expansion division.

The Golden Knights were only the second captainless team since 1973 to be in the Finals, and the first since the New York Rangers in 2014.

Game summaries
 Number in parenthesis represents the player's total goals or assists to that point of the entire four rounds of the playoffs

Game one

Both teams scored twice in the opening period. The first goal came from Vegas Golden Knights defenceman Colin Miller whose slap shot went past Capitals goaltender Braden Holtby. Washington struck back later in the period as both Brett Connolly and Nicklas Backstrom scored 42 seconds apart. William Karlsson then snuck the puck in between Holtby and the left post to tie the game. Early in the second period, a rebound off the glass came to Deryk Engelland who passed to an open Reilly Smith firing one past Holtby. Capitals defenceman John Carlson tied up the score after some nice passing from the defender and T. J. Oshie left himself wide open for the goal. In the third period, Tom Wilson redirected Alexander Ovechkin's shot past Vegas goaltender Marc-Andre Fleury to take the lead in the game. However, Vegas responded 1:41 later as Ryan Reaves went top-shelf to tie the game yet again. This goal proved to be controversial, as Ryan Reaves illegally cross-checked John Carlson to get into position to score. Tomas Nosek was able to score for Vegas later in the period, taking the pass from Shea Theodore. Vegas kept the lead in the penultimate minutes, grabbing an empty-net goal in the final minute to finish the game 6–4.

Game two

During the first period of game two, James Neal took a pass from Luca Sbisa, firing a wrist shot past Braden Holtby. The Capitals tied the game during a four-on-four when Lars Eller shot into an empty net from Michal Kempny's pass. During the second period, Golden Knights rookie Alex Tuch was penalized for cross-checking, and on the ensuing power-play, Capitals captain Alexander Ovechkin fired a shot from a tight angle to give Washington the lead. Brooks Orpik extended the Capitals' lead to two goals when his shot deflected off Alex Tuch past Marc-Andre Fleury. Vegas cut the deficit by one goal when T. J. Oshie interfered with Colin Miller and Shea Theodore scored on the power-play. In the third period Holtby backstopped Washington to the victory, stopping the final fifteen shots from Vegas to win 3–2.

Game three

After a tense first period in which neither team scored, Alexander Ovechkin scored early in the second period to give Washington the lead. Evgeny Kuznetsov, who was believed to have suffered an arm injury the game prior, scored 11:40 after Ovechkin, extending Washington's lead to two. Tomas Nosek scored off of a Braden Holtby giveaway to cut the deficit in half early in the third period. However, 10 minutes later Shea Theodore mishandled the puck in his own zone and Jay Beagle capitalized on the error, making a pass to an open Devante Smith-Pelly who restored the two-goal lead for Washington. The Capitals played defensively for the final minutes of the game to win 3–1, and took the series lead.

Game four

During the first period, a penalty called on Colin Miller for tripping allowed T. J. Oshie to give Washington the first lead. The Capitals extended the lead after Evgeny Kuznetsov fed a pass to Tom Wilson who fired a wrist shot past Marc-Andre Fleury. Devante Smith-Pelly then gave Washington a 3–0 lead after a pass by Matt Niskanen deflected off Vegas forward Jonathan Marchessault to the stick of Smith-Pelly, who scored top-shelf on Fleury. Even with the Golden Knights more than doubling the shots of Washington, John Carlson gave the Capitals a 4–0 lead, firing a slap shot on the power-play. In the third period, Vegas ended the shutout as James Neal scored just as Evgeny Kuznetsov's tripping penalty had expired. Reilly Smith cut the deficit to two goals, scoring on the backhand past Braden Holtby. Washington restored a three-goal lead during a four-on-four; as Nicklas Backstrom fed an open Michal Kempny, firing the shot past Fleury. Brett Connolly added an insurance goal with less than two minutes remaining, giving the Capitals a commanding 6–2 lead.

Game five

Although no goals were scored in the first period, the Capitals had the shot advantage nine to seven. During the second period, Tom Wilson passed to a speedy Jakub Vrana going past the Golden Knight's defender and beating Marc-Andre Fleury to take the lead. The Golden Knights tied the game soon after as former-Capitals defenceman Nate Schmidt shot through a flurry of players and the puck deflected off of Matt Niskanen past Braden Holtby. Alexander Ovechkin gave the Capitals the lead again on the power play, firing a shot onto Fleury, bouncing off his back and into the net. With the goal, it broke a tie with John Druce for most goals in a postseason by a Capitals player with fifteen. David Perron tied the game for Vegas, scoring his first goal of the postseason via deflection. Coach Barry Trotz of the Capitals challenged the play on goaltender interference as Perron appeared to hit the skate of Holtby as he was battling for position; the challenge was unsuccessful. An open Reilly Smith gave the Golden Knights the lead in the final minute of the second period, taking the pass from Alex Tuch. Halfway through the third period, Devante Smith-Pelly tied the game for the Capitals. Less than three minutes later, a shot came from the slot and went between Fleury's pads, but, unbeknownst to Fleury and his defensemen, the puck sneaked through and was lying in view just behind him, and Lars Eller forehanded it into the net to give the Capitals the lead with 7:37 left. With two minutes left, Vegas pulled Fleury for an extra attacker. At 18:11 of the third period, the game clock froze; however, the next stoppage in play occurred at 28.9 seconds remaining, allowing the clock to be readjusted. Nevertheless, the attempts of the Golden Knights were thwarted as the Capitals held on to win the game and their first Stanley Cup. Ovechkin was awarded the Conn Smythe Trophy.

Team rosters

Vegas Golden Knights
 

Note: ''Deryk Engelland served as the Golden Knights unofficial team captain during the 2018 Stanley Cup playoffs. Engelland was the alternate captain with the longest tenure in the league on the roster at the time of the playoffs.

Washington Capitals

Stanley Cup engraving

The Stanley Cup was presented to Capitals captain Alexander Ovechkin by NHL commissioner Gary Bettman following the Capitals 4–3 win over the Golden Knights in game five.

The following Capitals players and staff had their names engraved on the Stanley Cup:

2017–18 Washington Capitals

Players included
 #6 Michal Kempny — played 31 regular-season games for Chicago, 22 games for Washington. He played all 24 playoff games for Washington and qualified to have his name on the Stanley Cup.
 #39 Alex Chiasson — played 61 regular-season games and 16 playoff games, but no Stanley Cup Finals games, qualified to have his name on the Cup for meeting the 41 regular-season game requirement.
 #22 Madison Bowey — played 51 regular-season games and no playoff games, qualified to have his name on the Cup for meeting the 41 regular season game requirement.

Included in the team picture, but left off the Stanley Cup
 #28 Jakub Jerabek (D) — played 25 games for Montreal, plus 11 regular-season games for Washington and two playoff games (in the first round)
 #72 Travis Boyd (C) — played 8 regular-season games and one playoff game (in the second round)
 #79 Nathan Walker (LW) — played 2 games for Edmonton, plus 7 regular-season games for Washington & one playoff game (in the second round)
 #63 Shane Gersich (LW) — played 3 regular-season games and two playoff games (in the second round)
Raul Fernandez (Vice Chairman-Minority Owner), Sheila Johnson (Vice Chairman-Minority Owner)
Cleo Bates (Massage Therapist), Ray Straccia (Locker Room Asst.)

Engraving notes
Devante Smith-Pelly was the second player, after Patrice Bergeron-Cleary, to have a hyphenated surname engraved on the trophy. 
Lars Eller was the first Danish-born and trained player to win the Stanley Cup.
The Cup was full, so a new ring was added to include Washington Capitals members. The top ring with the winners from 1953–54 to 1964-65 (12 teams) was taken off and was placed on permanent display at the Hockey Hall of Fame. Some famous names no longer featured on the Cup include Dickie Moore, Maurice Richard, Jacques Plante, Bert Olmstead, Ted Lindsay, Alex Delvecchio, Gordie Howe, Stan Mikita, Bobby Hull, among others. There are several retired rings at the Hockey Hall of Fame that feature winning team members' names from 1924 to 1965.
The Patrick Family now has 7 members who have won the Stanley Cup. Frank won the Cup in 1915. Frank's brother, Lester, won Cups in 1906-07-25-28-33-40. In 1940, Lester won his 6th and final Stanley Cup with his sons Lynn and Murray. Lynn's son Craig won 2 Cups in 1991–92. Murray's son Dick and grandson Christopher both won the Cup in 2018.

Television and radio
In Canada, the series was broadcast by Sportsnet and CBC Television in English, and TVA Sports in French. In the U.S., the Finals were split between NBC (Games 1, 4 and 5) and NBCSN (Games 2 and 3).

In the U.S., with an average of 4.918 million viewers across all games, they were the highest-rated Stanley Cup Finals without an "Original Six" team since 1994. Game 5 drew 6.714 million viewers, making it the most-watched game 5 since 2002.

References

External links
Official website

 
2017–18 NHL season
Stanley Cup Finals
Stanley Cup
Stanley Cup
Washington Capitals games
Vegas Golden Knights games
Ice hockey competitions in Las Vegas
Ice hockey competitions in Washington, D.C.
Stanley Cup
Stanley Cup